Mughrabi, Mugrabi, Mograby, Mograbi, or Moghrabi is a surname and place name derived from "Maghreb" – meaning "West" in Arabic, and usually referring to North Africa or specifically to Morocco, i.e., the westernmost part of the Arab and Muslim world. It exists among both Muslims and Jews originating from this region.

Arabs originating from the Levant (Lebanon, Palestine, Syria, and Jordan) who hold the surname " Al Moghrabi" can trace their lineage back to the Son of Saladin, Malik Al Afdal,who established the Moroccan Quarter in East Jerusalem, dedicated to Maghrebi migrants coming from Northern Africa.

Mughrabi
 Ibrahim Mughrabi, Syrian football player
 Avi Mograbi, Israeli documentary filmmaker
 Dalal Mughrabi, Palestinian militant involved in killing Israeli civilians (March 11, 1978)
 Firas Mugrabi, Israeli football player
 Jose Mugrabi, art collector

El Mughrabi
 Mohammad Al Mughrabi, Jordanian interior designer
 Ismael Al-Maghrebi, Saudi Arabian football player
 Ahmed El Maghrabi, Egyptian businessman and politician
 Khalil Amira El-Maghrabi, Egyptian boxer
 Jomana Elmaghrabi, Egyptian synchronised swimmer
 Razan Naiem Almoghrabi, Libyan writer and feminist
 Samy Elmaghribi, Jewish-Moroccan musician
 Khaled Al-Maghrabi, Saudi Arabian football player
 Muhammad Al Maghrabi, Libyan football player

Locations
 Mughrabi Quarter or Moroccan Quarter, historic quarter of the Old City of Jerusalem, razed in 1967 to make way for the Wailing Wall Plaza
Mughrabi, Yemen

Arabic-language surnames